The 1897 Brooklyn Bridegrooms finished the season tied for sixth place under new manager Billy Barnie. Also the team's ownership underwent a change as Charles Byrne and Ferdinand Abell buy the shares previously owned by George Chauncey and Charles Ebbets becomes a part owner of the team.

Offseason 
 November 13, 1896: Tommy Corcoran was traded by the Bridegrooms to the Cincinnati Reds for Germany Smith, Chauncey Fisher and cash.
 Prior to 1897 season: Claude Ritchey was purchased from the Bridegrooms by the Cincinnati Reds.

Regular season

Season standings

Record vs. opponents

Roster

Player stats

Batting

Starters by position 
Note: Pos = Position; G = Games played; AB = At bats; R = Runs; H = Hits; Avg. = Batting average; HR = Home runs; RBI = Runs batted in; SB = Stolen bases

Other batters 
Note: G = Games played; AB = At bats; R = Runs; H = Hits; Avg. = Batting average; HR = Home runs; RBI = Runs batted in; SB = Stolen bases

Pitching

Starting pitchers 
Note: G = Games pitched; GS = Games started; IP = Innings pitched; W = Wins; L = Losses; ERA = Earned run average; BB = Bases on balls; SO = Strikeouts; CG = Complete games

Other pitchers 
Note: G = Games pitched; GS = Games started; IP = Innings pitched; W = Wins; L = Losses; ERA = Earned run average; BB = Bases on balls; SO = Strikeouts; CG = Complete games

Notes

References 
Baseball-Reference season page
Baseball Almanac season page

External links 
Brooklyn Dodgers reference site
Acme Dodgers page 
Retrosheet

Brooklyn Bridegrooms
Los Angeles Dodgers seasons
Brooklyn
19th century in Brooklyn
Brownsville, Brooklyn